Fiordaliza Beato Claudio (born 21 May 1995) is a Dominican footballer who plays as a defender. She has been a member of the Dominican Republic women's national team.

International career
Beato represented the Dominican Republic at two CONCACAF Women's U-17 Championship qualifying stages (2010 and 2012). At senior level, she capped during the 2014 Central American and Caribbean Games.

References 

1995 births
Living people
Women's association football defenders
Dominican Republic women's footballers
People from La Vega Province
Dominican Republic women's international footballers
Competitors at the 2014 Central American and Caribbean Games